Nils Krister Bringéus (born 7 September 1954) is a Swedish diplomat.

Early life and postings
He is the son of ethnologist  and Doctor of Philosophy Gundis Bringéus (née Lindahl). He served at the Embassy of Sweden, Moscow from 1975 to 1976 and was chancellery secretary of the Foreign Ministry from 1979 to 1980. He was embassy secretary at the Embassy in Pyongyang from 1980 to 1981 and at the Embassy in London from 1981 to 1984, after which he was First Secretary at the Embassy in Moscow from 1984 to 1987. In 1987–1990, he was embassy secretary in the Personnel Department of the Ministry for Foreign Affairs, after which he was First Secretary at the Embassy in Bonn between 1990 and 1992 and Embassy Counselor at the Embassy in Washington between 1992 and 1997. He was Ministerial Adviser at the Department for European Security Policy in the Ministry for Foreign Affairs from 1997 to 2002, first as Deputy Head of department from 1997 to 1998 and then as Head of the department from 1998 to 2002.

Senior roles and ambassadorships
In 2002 Bringéus was appointed head of the Swedish delegation at the Organization for Security and Co-operation in Europe in Vienna, holding the post until 2007. In 2007 he was appointed , with dual accreditation to Montenegro. He held this role until 2010, which was followed with a posting that year as Senior Civilian Representative at Mazar-e Sharif with responsibility for the overall political leadership and Swedish civilian activities in the area, until 2011.

From 2011, Bringéus was an ambassador for Arctic issues at the Ministry for Foreign Affairs and from 2015 to 2016 was a special investigator of Sweden's defence and security policy collaborations.

Personal life and honours
Bringéus was elected a member of the Royal Swedish Academy of War Sciences in 2000. On 25 September 2020 he was awarded the Grand Cross of the Royal Norwegian Order of Merit.

Bringéus is married to Veronika Bard-Bringéus, also a diplomat.

References 

1954 births
Living people
Ambassadors of Sweden to Norway
Ambassadors of Sweden to Serbia
Ambassadors of Sweden to Montenegro
Stockholm University alumni
Uppsala University alumni
Paul Cézanne University alumni
People from Lund
Members of the Royal Swedish Academy of War Sciences